This is a list of electoral division results for the 2019 Australian federal election in the state of Victoria. Victoria bucked the national trend, seeing a swing from the Coalition to Labor, whereas the swing across Australia was from Labor to the Coalition.

Overall results

Results by division

Aston

Ballarat

Bendigo

Bruce

Calwell

Casey

Chisholm

Julia Banks was elected as the Liberal member for Chisholm in 2016, but resigned from the party in November 2018 and sat as an independent. She unsuccessfully contested [[Results of the 2019 Australian federal election in Victoria#Flinders|Flinders]] as an independent.

Cooper

Corangamite

As a result of the 2018 boundary redistribution, the Liberal-held seats of Corangamite and [[Results of the 2019 Australian federal election in Victoria#Dunkley|Dunkley]] became notionally marginal Labor seats.

Corio

Deakin

Dunkley

As a result of the 2018 boundary redistribution, the Liberal-held seats of [[Results of the 2019 Australian federal election in Victoria#Corangamite|Corangamite]] and Dunkley became notionally marginal Labor seats.

Flinders

Fraser

Fraser was a new seat as a result of the 2018 boundary redistribution and was notionally held by Labor with a margin of 19.79%.

Gellibrand

Gippsland

Goldstein

Gorton

Higgins

Holt

Hotham

Indi

Sitting member Cathy McGowan (independent) did not contest the election and endorsed the candidacy of Helen Haines (independent).

Isaacs

Jagajaga

Kooyong

La Trobe

Lalor

Macnamara

Macnamara was a new electorate, notionally held by Labor

Mallee

Maribyrnong

McEwen

Melbourne

Menzies

Monash

Monash was a new seat notionally held by the Liberal Party.

Nicholls

Nicholls was a new seat, notionally held by the Nationals.

Scullin

Wannon

Wills

References

2019 Australian federal election
Victoria 2019